Conner Avenue Assembly is a Stellantis North America automobile factory in Detroit, Michigan. The factory opened in 1966 and was originally operated by spark plug company Champion. It was closed by Cooper Industries in 1990 shortly after their acquisition of Champion. In 1995, Chrysler purchased the facility to assemble the Dodge Viper; production began that October.

Viper production moved from New Mack Assembly to Conner in October 1995 and Plymouth Prowler production started in May 1997. The Viper's V10 engine was originally built at Mound Road Engine but moved to Conner Avenue in May 2001. The facility had been out of use since 2010, when Viper production temporarily ceased, however the plant resumed operations in late 2012 to build the Viper again. 

On July 12, 2017, Fiat Chrysler Automobiles (FCA) announced that due to the Viper's discontinuation, the plant would be shut down permanently on August 31. The factory's 86 workers were offered employment at other FCA sites.

However, in 2018 FCA announced that the plant will be renamed the "Conner Center" and will serve as "an internal meeting and display space that will showcase the Company’s concept and historic vehicle collection," some of which was formerly hosted at the now-closed Walter P. Chrysler Museum in Auburn Hills, Michigan.

Vehicles produced 
Dodge Viper (1995–2010, 2012–2017)
Chrysler Prowler (2001–2002)
Plymouth Prowler (1997, 1999–2000)
V10 engine (1995–2003)

References

Chrysler factories
Industrial buildings and structures in Detroit
Motor vehicle assembly plants in Michigan
1966 establishments in Michigan